Proteuxoa angasi is a moth of the family Noctuidae. It is found in South Australia, New South Wales and Victoria.

External links
Australian Faunal Directory

Proteuxoa
Moths of Australia
Moths described in 1874